Gunstock may refer to:

Objects
Stock (firearms), a part of a gun
Gunstock war club, a weapon resembling gunstocks

Place names in the United States
Gunstock Knob, a summit in West Virginia
Gunstock Mountain, a New Hampshire mountain
Gunstock Mountain Resort, an alpine ski area located on the New Hampshire mountain
Gunstock River, New Hampshire